Montpelier is a small suburb, located a little way north of Ealing Broadway in west London.

Nearby places include Ealing Broadway, Pitshanger, West Ealing, and Hanwell.

The route of the Ealing Half Marathon passes through Montpelier.

References

Areas of London
Districts of the London Borough of Ealing